The Ufa constituency (No.3) is a Russian legislative constituency in Bashkortostan. The constituency covers parts of Ufa and suburbs around it. The present day Ufa constituency was created in 2015 after combining old Kirovsky and Sovetsky constituencies.

Members elected

Election results

1993

|-
! colspan=2 style="background-color:#E9E9E9;text-align:left;vertical-align:top;" |Candidate
! style="background-color:#E9E9E9;text-align:left;vertical-align:top;" |Party
! style="background-color:#E9E9E9;text-align:right;" |Votes
! style="background-color:#E9E9E9;text-align:right;" |%
|-
|style="background-color:"|
|align=left|Rais Asayev
|align=left|Agrarian Party
|
|22.82%
|-
|style="background-color:"|
|align=left|Pavel Dmitriyev
|align=left|Independent
| -
|14.94%
|-
| colspan="5" style="background-color:#E9E9E9;"|
|- style="font-weight:bold"
| colspan="3" style="text-align:left;" | Total
| 
| 100%
|-
| colspan="5" style="background-color:#E9E9E9;"|
|- style="font-weight:bold"
| colspan="4" |Source:
|
|}

1995

|-
! colspan=2 style="background-color:#E9E9E9;text-align:left;vertical-align:top;" |Candidate
! style="background-color:#E9E9E9;text-align:left;vertical-align:top;" |Party
! style="background-color:#E9E9E9;text-align:right;" |Votes
! style="background-color:#E9E9E9;text-align:right;" |%
|-
|style="background-color:"|
|align=left|Valentin Nikitin
|align=left|Communist Party
|
|23.20%
|-
|style="background-color:#E98282"|
|align=left|Minrauza Nazmetdinova
|align=left|Women of Russia
|
|15.49%
|-
|style="background-color:"|
|align=left|Ravil Nasibullin
|align=left|Our Home – Russia
|
|13.68%
|-
|style="background-color:"|
|align=left|Mars Safarov
|align=left|Education — Future of Russia
|
|6.55%
|-
|style="background-color:#DD137B"|
|align=left|Sergey Lavrentyev
|align=left|Social Democrats
|
|4.02%
|-
|style="background-color:"|
|align=left|Ibragim Gulayev
|align=left|Power to the People
|
|3.20%
|-
|style="background-color:#5A5A58"|
|align=left|Erast Fomichev
|align=left|Federal Democratic Movement
|
|3.13%
|-
|style="background-color:#DA2021"|
|align=left|Anatoly Polyntsev
|align=left|Ivan Rybkin Bloc
|
|2.84%
|-
|style="background-color:#D50000"|
|align=left|Konstantin Prasolov
|align=left|Communists and Working Russia - for the Soviet Union
|
|2.77%
|-
|style="background-color:#1C1A0D"|
|align=left|Leo Sharygin
|align=left|Forward, Russia!
|
|2.12%
|-
|style="background-color:"|
|align=left|Anatoly Baydin
|align=left|Political Movement of Transport Workers
|
|2.06%
|-
|style="background-color:#3A46CE"|
|align=left|Faiz Galikeyev
|align=left|Democratic Choice of Russia – United Democrats
|
|2.04%
|-
|style="background-color:"|
|align=left|Askhat Iskhakov
|align=left|Liberal Democratic Party
|
|2.02%
|-
|style="background-color:"|
|align=left|Valery Geta
|align=left|Independent
|
|1.63%
|-
|style="background-color:"|
|align=left|Altaf Galeyev
|align=left|Independent
|
|1.59%
|-
|style="background-color:"|
|align=left|Sergey Starovoytov
|align=left|Independent
|
|0.58%
|-
|style="background-color:#000000"|
|colspan=2 |against all
|
|9.20%
|-
| colspan="5" style="background-color:#E9E9E9;"|
|- style="font-weight:bold"
| colspan="3" style="text-align:left;" | Total
| 
| 100%
|-
| colspan="5" style="background-color:#E9E9E9;"|
|- style="font-weight:bold"
| colspan="4" |Source:
|
|}

1999

|-
! colspan=2 style="background-color:#E9E9E9;text-align:left;vertical-align:top;" |Candidate
! style="background-color:#E9E9E9;text-align:left;vertical-align:top;" |Party
! style="background-color:#E9E9E9;text-align:right;" |Votes
! style="background-color:#E9E9E9;text-align:right;" |%
|-
|style="background-color:"|
|align=left|Robert Nigmatulin
|align=left|Independent
|
|33.99%
|-
|style="background-color:"|
|align=left|Valentin Nikitin (incumbent)
|align=left|Communist Party
|
|17.60%
|-
|style="background-color:"|
|align=left|Marat Mirgazyamov
|align=left|Yabloko
|
|15.68%
|-
|style="background-color:"|
|align=left|Mikhail Davydov
|align=left|Independent
|
|14.01%
|-
|style="background-color:"|
|align=left|Mikhail Anferov
|align=left|Independent
|
|3.42%
|-
|style="background-color:"|
|align=left|Airat Dilmukhametov
|align=left|Independent
|
|3.36%
|-
|style="background-color:"|
|align=left|Ural Suleymanov
|align=left|Independent
|
|2.04%
|-
|style="background-color:"|
|align=left|Rafail Dzhalilov
|align=left|Independent
|
|0.97%
|-
|style="background-color:#000000"|
|colspan=2 |against all
|
|6.84%
|-
| colspan="5" style="background-color:#E9E9E9;"|
|- style="font-weight:bold"
| colspan="3" style="text-align:left;" | Total
| 
| 100%
|-
| colspan="5" style="background-color:#E9E9E9;"|
|- style="font-weight:bold"
| colspan="4" |Source:
|
|}

2003

|-
! colspan=2 style="background-color:#E9E9E9;text-align:left;vertical-align:top;" |Candidate
! style="background-color:#E9E9E9;text-align:left;vertical-align:top;" |Party
! style="background-color:#E9E9E9;text-align:right;" |Votes
! style="background-color:#E9E9E9;text-align:right;" |%
|-
|style="background-color:"|
|align=left|Mars Kalmetyev
|align=left|United Russia
|
|27.09%
|-
|style="background-color:"|
|align=left|Valentin Nikitin
|align=left|Communist Party
|
|12.13%
|-
|style="background-color:"|
|align=left|Fail Safin
|align=left|Independent
|
|10.65%
|-
|style="background-color:"|
|align=left|Robert Nigmatulin (incumbent)
|align=left|Independent
|
|9.83%
|-
|style="background-color:"|
|align=left|Flyur Asadullin
|align=left|Independent
|
|8.37%
|-
|style="background-color:"|
|align=left|Aleksey Morozov
|align=left|Independent
|
|7.19%
|-
|style="background-color:"|
|align=left|Rafika Amineva
|align=left|Rodina
|
|4.54%
|-
|style="background-color:"|
|align=left|Artur Asafyev
|align=left|Yabloko
|
|4.21%
|-
|style="background-color:#164C8C"|
|align=left|Aleksandr Tokarchuk
|align=left|United Russian Party Rus'
|
|1.48%
|-
|style="background-color:#000000"|
|colspan=2 |against all
|
|9.72%
|-
| colspan="5" style="background-color:#E9E9E9;"|
|- style="font-weight:bold"
| colspan="3" style="text-align:left;" | Total
| 
| 100%
|-
| colspan="5" style="background-color:#E9E9E9;"|
|- style="font-weight:bold"
| colspan="4" |Source:
|
|}

2016

|-
! colspan=2 style="background-color:#E9E9E9;text-align:left;vertical-align:top;" |Candidate
! style="background-color:#E9E9E9;text-align:leftt;vertical-align:top;" |Party
! style="background-color:#E9E9E9;text-align:right;" |Votes
! style="background-color:#E9E9E9;text-align:right;" |%
|-
| style="background-color: " |
|align=left|Pavel Kachkayev
|align=left|United Russia
|
|53.63%
|-
|style="background-color:"|
|align=left|Aleksandr Yushchenko
|align=left|Communist Party
|
|18.17%
|-
|style="background-color:"|
|align=left|Renat Minniakhmetov
|align=left|Liberal Democratic Party
|
|6.82%
|-
|style="background-color:"|
|align=left|Aigul Baiguskarova
|align=left|A Just Russia
|
|5.68%
|-
|style="background-color:"|
|align=left|Yelena Andreyeva
|align=left|The Greens
|
|3.58%
|-
|style="background-color:"|
|align=left|Rais Saubanov
|align=left|Patriots of Russia
|
|3.24%
|-
|style="background-color:"|
|align=left|Boris Nurislamov
|align=left|Communists of Russia
|
|2.87%
|-
|style="background-color:"|
|align=left|Viktor Petrov
|align=left|Party of Growth
|
|2.47%
|-
|style="background-color:"|
|align=left|Fail Safin
|align=left|Rodina
|
|2.41%
|-
| colspan="5" style="background-color:#E9E9E9;"|
|- style="font-weight:bold"
| colspan="3" style="text-align:left;" | Total
| 
| 100%
|-
| colspan="5" style="background-color:#E9E9E9;"|
|- style="font-weight:bold"
| colspan="4" |Source:
|
|}

2021

|-
! colspan=2 style="background-color:#E9E9E9;text-align:left;vertical-align:top;" |Candidate
! style="background-color:#E9E9E9;text-align:left;vertical-align:top;" |Party
! style="background-color:#E9E9E9;text-align:right;" |Votes
! style="background-color:#E9E9E9;text-align:right;" |%
|-
|style="background-color: " |
|align=left|Pavel Kachkayev (incumbent)
|align=left|United Russia
|
|66.25%
|-
|style="background-color:"|
|align=left|Aleksandr Yushchenko
|align=left|Communist Party
|
|11.16%
|-
|style="background-color:"|
|align=left|Veronika Ananyeva
|align=left|Liberal Democratic Party
|
|9.09%
|-
|style="background-color:"|
|align=left|Flyur Nurlygayanov
|align=left|A Just Russia — For Truth
|
|3.07%
|-
|style="background-color:"|
|align=left|Pavel Matisov
|align=left|Communists of Russia
|
|2.60%
|-
|style="background-color:"|
|align=left|Yevgeny Buyanov
|align=left|New People
|
|2.55%
|-
|style="background-color: "|
|align=left|Gulnara Ruchkina
|align=left|Party of Pensioners
|
|1.59%
|-
|style="background-color:"|
|align=left|Irina Kureli
|align=left|Yabloko
|
|0.86%
|-
|style="background-color:"|
|align=left|Arseny Maslov
|align=left|Rodina
|
|0.84%
|-
|style="background-color:"|
|align=left|Zhanna Virfel
|align=left|Party of Growth
|
|0.83%
|-
| colspan="5" style="background-color:#E9E9E9;"|
|- style="font-weight:bold"
| colspan="3" style="text-align:left;" | Total
| 
| 100%
|-
| colspan="5" style="background-color:#E9E9E9;"|
|- style="font-weight:bold"
| colspan="4" |Source:
|
|}

Notes

References 

Russian legislative constituencies
Politics of Bashkortostan